The second death is an eschatological concept in Judaism, Christianity, and Mandaeism related to punishment after a first/initial death on Earth.

Judaism

In most cases, the "second death" is identical with the judgment, following the resurrection, in Gehinnom at the Last Day.

Targum Deuteronomy
In Targum Neofiti (Neof.) and the fragments (FTP and FTV), on the verse Deutoronomy 33:6, the "second death" is "the death that the wicked die."

Targum Isaiah
Targum Isaiah has three occurrences. The first is 22:14, where the Aramaic paraphrases the Hebrew as "This sin will not be forgiven you until you die the second death."
 The final two examples are from Targum Isaiah 65, which sets the scene for an apocalyptic final battle. Targum Isaiah 65:6 paraphrases the Hebrew in line with the interpretation of the penultimate verse of the Hebrew Isaiah found in the Gospel of Mark, where "their worm does not die" is equated with Gehinnom. Here both Targum Isaiah and Gospel of Mark supply the term "Gehinnom", where Hebrew Isaiah simply concludes with the heaps of corpses following the last battle where "their worm does not die", making no further eschatological extension into resurrection and judgment.

Targum Jeremiah
Targum Jeremiah 51:17 has the Aramaic "they shall die the second death and not live in the world to come", which appears to depart from the other Targum uses in not being explicit that the second death is  resurrection but may instead be an exclusion from resurrection.

Targum Psalms
The majority reading of Targum Psalm 49:11 has the Aramaic translation "For the wise see that the evil-doers are judged in Gehinnom". However, several manuscripts, including Paris No.10, Montefiore No.7, and Targum of Salomos 113 have the variant Aramaic translation "He sees men wise in wickedness, who die a second death, and are judged in Gehinnom".

Rabbinic interpretations
David Kimhi (Toulouse, c.1160-Narbonne, 1235) considered the phrase to mean "the death of the soul in the world".

Maimonides declares, in his 13 principles of faith, that the souls of the wicked would be punished with annihilation.

Bahya ben Asher understands second death as referring to the death of a soul after it has been reincarnated, i.e., after Gilgul Neshamot.

Christianity

The term "second death" occurs four times in the New Testament, specifically in Revelation 2:11, 20:6, 20:14 and 21:8. According to Revelation 2:11 and 20:6, those who overcome the devil's tribulation have part in the first resurrection and will not be hurt by the second death, which has no power over them. Revelation 20:14 and 21:8 then connects the second death with the lake of fire. In  we read: "[A]s for the cowardly, the faithless, the polluted, the murderers, the fornicators, the sorcerers, the idolaters, and all liars, their place will be in the lake that burns with fire and sulfur, which is the second death."

Interpretation
One interpretation states that when people are saved, they are not subject to the second death and only die of the earthly first death, whereas an unsaved person will experience two deaths: the first at the end of this life and the second after the resurrection. Some understand the second death to be primarily a spiritual one, i.e., separation from God, but it is usually thought to entail torment or destruction too. The second death has been interpreted as endless torment by many, Lactantius being one of them:

Annihilationists and conditionalists, including all Seventh-day Adventists and Jehovah's Witnesses, and others in many denominations, oppose the idea of eternal suffering and believe that the second death is a literal death and that the bodies and souls condemned to it after the final judgment will be utterly destroyed.

Christian universalists, who believe all will be reconciled to God, offer different interpretations, rejecting both endless torment and utter destruction. For example, Gregory of Nyssa understood the second death as a cleansing, albeit a painful process. He wrote that "those still living in the flesh must as much as ever they can separate and free themselves in a way from its attachments by virtuous conduct, in order that after death they may not need a second death to cleanse them".

Mandaeism
Mandaeans believe that the souls which could not be purified inside of demon Ur would get destroyed along with him at the end of days, so they die the second death. Other evil powers and the planets will suffer this "second death" in the blazing "sea of the end" as well.

See also
 Spiritual death

References

Afterlife in Christianity
Jewish eschatology
Religion and death
Gehenna